Apatetris is a genus of moths in the family Gelechiidae.

Species
Apatetris agenjoi Gozmány, 1954
Apatetris caecivaga Meyrick, 1928
Apatetris echiochilonella (Chrétien, 1908)
Apatetris elaeagnella Sakamaki, 2000
Apatetris elymicola Sakamaki, 2000
Apatetris halimilignella (Walsingham, 1904)
Apatetris mediterranella Nel & Varenne, 2012
Apatetris mirabella Staudinger, 1880
Apatetris tamaricicola (Walsingham, 1911)

Former species
Apatetris altithermella (Walsingham, 1903)
Apatetris kinkerella (Snellen, 1876)
Apatetris nivea Philpott, 1930

References

 , 2010: The gelechiid fauna of the southern Ural Mountains, part I: descriptions of seventeen new species (Lepidoptera: Gelechiidae). Zootaxa 2366: 1-34. Abstract: http://www.mapress.com/zootaxa/2010/f/z02366p034f.pdf
 , 2000: Japanese species of the genus Apatetris (Lepidoptera: Gelechiidae). Tijdschrift voor Entomologie 143: 211-220. Full article: .

 
Apatetrini
Moth genera